Hurricane season may refer to:
 Atlantic hurricane season
 Pacific hurricane season
 Hurricane Season (film), a 2010 film by Tim Story
 Hurricane Season (album), a 2011 album by Dan Andriano
 Sports years of various sports of the Miami Hurricanes of the University of Miami
 Hurricane Season: Walking on Dead Fish, 2008 documentary film about football in the wake of Katrina directed by Franklin Martin
 Hurricane Season, a 2007 book by author Neal Thompson about a football team's success after Hurricane Katrina
 Hurricane Season (novel), a 2017 novel by Mexican writer Fernanda Melchor